The Spianada ("esplanade") is a large square in the city of Corfu, Greece. It is the largest square in Greece and is located in front of the Old Fortress of the city of Corfu.

History
The square's name derives from the Venetian word for "open flat area", during the four centuries of Venetian rule in the island of Corfu.

Its final construction dates back to the temporary French occupation of the Ionian islands and Corfu during the Napoleonic Wars.

The "cricket court", a large park area, occupies a large section of the square. The love of the city inhabitants for cricket is of British origin, from the period of British domination (1814-1864).

It is one of the most central and popular sites of the city and a tourist destination.

See also
Liston (Corfu)

Gallery

References 

Squares in Greece
Buildings and structures in Corfu (city)
Italianate architecture in Greece
French rule in the Ionian Islands (1807–1814)
Cricket in Greece